State Road 430 (SR 430) is an east–west state highway in Daytona Beach, running between SR 483/Clyde Morris Boulevard and SR A1A/Atlantic Avenue.

West of the Halifax River, the route runs along Mason Avenue; the Seabreeze Bridge over the river is a dual span connecting to a one-way pair on the beachside, with Oakridge Boulevard eastbound and Seabreeze Boulevard westbound.

Major intersections

References

External links

430
430
430
Daytona Beach, Florida